Andrea Rubei (born 20 December 1966) is an Italian former futsal player who was a universal player for several teams in the Italian Serie A and the Italian national team. Regarded by some as the best Italian futsal player of all time, Rubei was crowned Italian champion on four occasions, twice with Torrino, and once with both Torino and Prato. Upon his retirement from the national team Rubei was the team's top goal scorer and achieved the impressive feat of scoring a higher number of goals than his number of caps.

Honours 

Torrino
 Serie A: 1992–1993, 1993–94
 Coppa Italia: 1992–93, 1993–94, 1994–95
Torino
 Serie A: 1998–99
 Supercoppa Italiana: 1997, 1998
Prato
 Serie A: 2002–03
 Coppa Italia: 2003–04
 Supercoppa Italiana: 2002, 2003
Nepi
 Coppa Italia: 2004–05
Isola
 Serie A2: 2015–16
Individual
 Serie A top scorer: 1993–94

References

External links
The Final Ball profile

1966 births
Living people
Italian men's futsal players